The Philippine five-peso note (Filipino: Limang Piso) (₱5) was a denomination of Philippine currency. Philippine president Emilio Aguinaldo is featured on the front side of the note, while the Declaration of the Philippine Independence is featured on the reverse side. This banknote was circulated until the demonetization of the New Design Series on December 29, 2017. Its printing was stopped in 1995 and was replaced by coins.

History

Pre-independence
1903: Philippine Islands issued silver certificates. Features a portrait of William McKinley.
1908: Banco Español Filipino issued notes.
1918: Philippine Treasury Certificates issued with a portrait of William McKinley. Design revised from 1929 to also include the portrait of George Dewey.
1920: BPI issued notes.
1936: PNB issued notes.
1937: Philippine Commonwealth issued treasury certificate. Features the portraits of William McKinley and George Dewey on both sides of the obverse. This series were later overprinted with the word "VICTORY" on the reverse after the liberation of the Philippines under Japanese rule in 1944.
1942: Japanese government issued series. Features a farmer in a forest on the right of the obverse, with the number "5" on the center. Another version, this time featuring the Rizal Monument on the right of the obverse, was released in 1944. The banknotes ceased to be legal tender after the liberation.
1949: The five peso bill issues whoever in "VICTORY, CENTRAL BANK OF THE PHILIPPINES" at back

Version history

Independence

English series (1951–1970) 
Features the portraits of Marcelo H. Del Pilar and Graciano Lopez-Jaena, two important figures of the Propaganda movement before the Philippine revolution, on the obverse. The reverse features the official newspaper of the propaganda movement, the La Solidaridad.

Pilipino series (1969–1973) 
In 1967, Andres Bonifacio replaced the portraits of Del Pilar and Lopez-Jaena. The note is now predominantly green in color. On the reverse, it now features the scenario of how to be a member of the Katipunan through signing a contract by their own blood. The design of the obverse was later revised, the font for the text Republika ng Pilipinas and Limang Piso was changed, the color of the portrait of Bonifacio was changed from brown to green and geometric lines were added on the sides and the watermark area of the bill. This design was later used when the Bagong Lipunan series was released in 1973.

Ang Bagong Lipunan series (1973–1985) 
In 1973, the "Ang Bagong Lipunan" text was added and was overprinted on the watermark area.

New Design series (1985–1995) 
In 1985, the bill was completely redesigned and Emilio Aguinaldo replaced Bonifacio in this series. The NHCP historical marker in the Malolos Cathedral (indicating the foundation of the First Philippine Republic, which Aguinaldo became its president) along with a cannon can be seen on the right side of the obverse. On the reverse, a scene from the Declaration of the Philippine Independence is featured. This was previously featured on the reverse of the Ang Bagong Lipunan series two peso banknote. The banknote was designed by Romeo Mananquil.

After the creation of the "Bangko Sentral ng Pilipinas", its new logo was incorporated on all the New Design series bills in 1993.

In 1995, the printing of this banknote was stopped after the Bangko Sentral ng Pilipinas released the new ₱5 coin denomination that coincided the launching of the Improved Flora and Fauna series coins and due to the release of the BSP series ₱5 coin on that same year, in which the bills also included in this series from 1993 to 1995. Because of this, it is the only banknote in the New Design/BSP series that did not add a year mark at the bottom of the denomination value located at the upper left corner of the obverse since the year of printing of a banknote was only added in 1998 (1997 for the ten peso banknotes), 2–3 years after the printing of the five peso banknotes became obsolete.

Version history

Commemorative issues
Throughout its existence, the five peso bill was often overprinted to commemorate certain events, namely:
State visit of President Corazon Aquino to the United States of America: In 1986, Bangko Sentral ng Pilipinas released a commemorative banknote for the commemoration of state visit of President Corazon Aquino to the United States. The overprint features the seal of the Philippine President with the words "PAGDALAW NG PANGULONG CORAZON C. AQUINO SA AMERIKA" and the date "SET. 15-23, 1986" is displayed below.
Canonization of Lorenzo Ruiz: The overprint features the first Filipino saint named San Lorenzo Ruiz with the words "KANONISASYON NG PINAGPALANG SAN LORENZO RUIZ" and the date "OKTUBRE 18, 1987".
40th anniversary of the Bangko Sentral ng Pilipinas: BSP released the overprint in commemoration of its 40th anniversary. It is printed in red, has the words "IKA-40 ANIBERSARYO" and "BANGKO SENTRAL NG PILIPINAS - 1949-1989" and features its building in Manila.
Commemoration of Women's rights: The overprint features a portrait of a woman holding a Philippine flag and around it has the words "KABABAIHAN PARA SA KAUNLARAN - 1990".
Plenary Council of the Philippines: Features a cross, the Philippine map on the lower-right corner of the circle, and the PX monogram. Around it are the words "UNITE ALL THINGS UNDER CHRIST (EPH 1:10)", "II PLENARY COUNCIL OF THE PHILIPPINES", and below it is the date "20 JANUARY TO 17 FEBRUARY 1991". This is the only time the overprint is in English language and the only commemorative banknote that features the signature of BSP governor Jose L. Cuisia, Jr.

Printing years

References

Banknotes of the Philippines
Five-base-unit banknotes